It's Not a Rumour is the debut studio album by English rapper Akala, released on 24 April 2006 on Illa State Records.

Track listing

Singles chart positions

References

2006 debut albums
Akala (rapper) albums